"Take Possession" is a single by American country music artist Jean Shepard.  It was released on the B-side of the single "A Satisfied Mind". The song reached #13 on the Billboard Most Played C&W in Juke Boxes chart.

Chart performance

References

Jean Shepard songs
1950 songs
Songs with lyrics by Tom Glazer